Starting Here, Starting Now is a musical revue with lyrics by Richard Maltby Jr. and music by David Shire.  With a cast of three and three musicians, the revue explores a variety of romantic relationships.

Productions
The revue was first produced at the Manhattan Theater Club in 1976 under the title Theater Songs by Maltby and Shire. In March 1977, the show moved to the Barbarann Theater Restaurant in New York City, where it ran for 120 performances.  The cast featured Loni Ackerman, Margery Cohen and George Lee Andrews.  The original cast album was nominated for a Grammy Award, and the 1993 London production also produced a cast album.  The revue continues to be frequently produced.

After Maltby and Shire graduated from Yale, they wrote many songs for shows that either closed out of town or were never produced.  Their songs tend to be "story songs", each giving the character(s) a chance to explore a mini-drama.  The two writers decided to assemble these songs into a revue, grouping them by theme.

Synopsis
Act I explores the humorous, joyful, melancholy and angry ups and downs of city romances.  In Act II, the songs present characters who have had unlucky experiences in love and life and who have a chance at a new start.

Song list

The Word Is Love 
Starting Here, Starting Now 
A Little Bit Off 
We Can Talk To Each Other 
Just Across The River 
I Think I May Want to Remember Today 
Today Is the First Day Of The Rest Of My Life 
Beautiful 
Crossword Puzzle 
Autumn 
I Don't Remember Christmas 
I Don't Believe It
I'm Going To Make You Beautiful 

You Can't Let Down Your Fans 
A Girl You Should Know 
Travel 
Watching The Big Parade Go By 
What About Today 
One Step 
Barbara 
Song Of Me 
A New Life Coming 
Pleased with Myself 
Flair 
I Hear Bells 

The Original Cast recording was released in 1977 by RCA (ASIN: B000002W3D).

Notes

References
Article describing the show's history and where the songs came from

External links
Starting Here, Starting Now at the Music Theatre International website
Starting Here, Starting Now at guidetomusicaltheatre
amazon.com listing
Musical Heaven

1976 musicals